The following radio stations broadcast on FM frequency 93.3 MHz:

Argentina

 Atlántica latina in Mar del Plata, Buenos Aires
 BitBox in Buenos Aires
 Central de noticias Madariaga in Madariaga, Buenos Aires
 Ciudad Noticias in Coronel Suarez, Buenos Aires
 del Aire in La Plata, Buenos Aires
 El triunfo rural in General Belgrano, Buenos Aires
 Espacial in Santa Fe
 Estilo in Fray Mamerto Esquiú, Catamarca
 Fox FM in Rosario, Santa Fe
 Global in Zárate, Buenos Aires
 Mas in El Colorado, Formosa
 Mitre Salta in Salta
 Mix in Eduardo Castex, La Pampa
 Norte in Rufino, Santa Fe
 Positiva in Puerto Madryn, Chubut
 Quiero Radio in Crespo, Entre Ríos
 Radio María in Pehuajó, Buenos Aires
 Radio María in Juan Bautista Alberdi, Tucumán
 Radio María in San Martín de los Andes, Neuquén
 Radio María in Eldorado, Misiones
 Rock and Pop Jujuy in San Salvador de Jujuy, Jujuy
 Siempre radio in Alta Gracia, Córdoba
 Temple in Haedo, Buenos Aires
 Universo - Vida General Arenales in General Arenales, Buenos Aires
 Vale in 9 de Julio, Buenos Aires
 Venecia in Federal, Entre Ríos

Australia
 Radio Five-0-Plus in Gosford, New South Wales
 SBS Radio in Brisbane, Queensland
 ABC Classic FM in Launceston, Tasmania
 ABC Classic FM in Hamilton, Victoria
 ABC Classic FM in Bunbury, Western Australia

Canada (Channel 227)

 CBH-FM-1 in Middleton, Nova Scotia
 CBKA-FM-1 in Creighton, Saskatchewan
 CBKH-FM in Stony Rapids, Saskatchewan
 CBKL-FM in Montreal Lake, Saskatchewan
 CFMU-FM in Hamilton, Ontario
 CFRU-FM in Guelph, Ontario
 CFXG-FM in Grande Cache, Alberta
 CFXU-FM in Antigonish, Nova Scotia
 CFYX-FM in Mont-Joli, Quebec
 CICH-FM in Chesterfield Inlet, Nunavut
 CIQA-FM in Iqaluit, Nunavut
 CIRC-FM in Fredericton, New Brunswick
 CISV-FM in Swan River, Manitoba
 CJAV-FM in Port Alberni, British Columbia
 CJBZ-FM in Taber, Alberta
 CJHD-FM in North Battleford, Saskatchewan
 CJMF-FM in Quebec City, Quebec
 CJOK-FM in Fort McMurray, Alberta
 CKGF-1-FM in Christina Lake, British Columbia
 CKRY-FM-2 in Banff, Alberta
 CKSG-FM in Cobourg, Ontario
 CKYL-FM-6 in Manning, Alberta
 VF2211 in Horse Camp Hill, Yukon
 VF2358 in Stewart Crossing, Yukon
 VF2366 in Sourdough, Yukon
 VF2504 in Paint Lake, Manitoba
 VF8020 in Rimbey, Alberta

China 
 CNR Music Radio in Jinggangshan

Honduras 
 HRAX Musiquera San Pedro Sula, Cortés
 HRAX Musiquera Puerto Cortés, Cortés
 HRXH Radio Globo Tocoa, Colón

Iraq
 Radio Al Mirbad in Basra

Japan
 JONR in Osaka
 JOGF in Oita

Malaysia
 Buletin FM in Ipoh, Perak (Coming Soon)

Mexico

XHACC-FM in Puerto Escondido, Oaxaca
XHBW-FM in Chihuahua, Chihuahua
XHCF-FM in Los Mochis, Sinaloa

XHEDT-FM in Toluca, Estado de México
XHEVE-FM in Colima, Colima
XHEXZ-FM in Zacatecas, Zacatecas
XHOLP-FM in Santa Rosalía, Baja California Sur

XHPGYM-FM in Guaymas, Sonora
XHPJMM-FM in José María Morelos, Quintana Roo
XHPNIC-FM in Nicolás Bravo, Quintana Roo
XHPNVA-FM in Nueva Italia, Michoacán
XHPNVO-FM in El Salto, Pueblo Nuevo Municipality, Durango
XHPS-FM in Veracruz, Veracruz
XHQQ-FM in Monterrey, Nuevo León
XHSCA-FM in Cananea, Sonora
XHSCCF-FM in Tlacolula de Matamoros, Oaxaca
XHTB-FM in Cuernavaca, Morelos
XHVSE-FM in Villa Sola de Vega, Oaxaca

Philippines
 DWBY in Roxas, Oriental Mindoro
 DXFB in Dipolog

Singapore
 YES 933 in Singapore

United States (Channel 227)

 KAGL in El Dorado, Arkansas
 KBGT in Buffalo Gap, Texas
 KBHR in Big Bear City, California
 KBLB in Nisswa, Minnesota
 KBOK-LP in Reno, Nevada
 KCEF in Chefornak, Alaska
 KCFZ-LP in Fresno, California
 KDKB in Mesa, Arizona
 KETQ-LP in Yuba City, California
 KEUB in Gearhart, Oregon
 KFFF in Bennington, Nebraska
 KFPP-LP in Woodward, Oklahoma
 KFZR-LP in Frazier Park, California
 KGAR-LP in Lemoore, California
 KGGL in Missoula, Montana
 KGSR in Cedar Park, Texas
 KHSK in Emmonak, Alaska
 KHTS-FM in El Cajon, California
 KIGL in Seligman, Missouri
 KIIW-LP in Dobbins, California
 KIOA in Des Moines, Iowa
 KJDX in Susanville, California
 KJKE in Newcastle, Oklahoma
 KJR-FM in Seattle, Washington
 KJRV in Wessington Springs, South Dakota
 KKDC in Dolores, Colorado
 KKNU in Springfield-Eugene, Oregon
 KKSP in Bryant, Arkansas
 KKWG in Kongiganak, Alaska
 KLED in Antelope Valley-Crestview, Wyoming
 KLIF-FM in Haltom City, Texas
 KLIT in Ranchitos Las Lomas, Texas
 KMJI in Ashdown, Arkansas
 KMOR in Gering, Nebraska
 KMXV in Kansas City, Missouri
 KNAL in Port Lavaca, Texas
 KNTO in Chowchilla, California
 KOBQ in Albuquerque, New Mexico
 KOXZ-LP in Ventura, California
 KPHD-LP in Modesto, California
  in Port Arthur, Texas
 KRHV in Big Pine, California
  in Walla Walla, Washington
 KRMR in Russian Mission, Alaska
 KRTK in Hermann, Missouri
  in San Francisco, California
  in Jamestown, North Dakota
  in Wheat Ridge, Colorado
  in Salt Lake City, Utah
 KUIT in Goodnews Bay, Alaska
 KUMC-LP in Rupert, Idaho
 KURL in Billings, Montana
 KUXL in Muleshoe, Texas
 KUZY in Nunum Iqua, Alaska
  in Valdez, Alaska
 KWEM-LP in West Memphis, Arkansas
 KWNQ in Quinhagak, Alaska
  in Page, Arizona
  in Nikiski, Alaska
 KYLO-LP in Woodland, California
 KYRR-LP in Nevada City, California
 KZBT in Midland, Texas
 KZHP-LP in Sacramento, California
  in San Luis Obispo, California
  in Cincinnati, Ohio
 WBSV-LP in Berrien Springs, Michigan
  in Ashland, Wisconsin
  in Kendallville, Indiana
  in New Paltz, New York
  in Muncy, Pennsylvania
 WCAN in Canajoharie, New York
  in Watertown, New York
  in Bowling Green, Kentucky
  in Washington, North Carolina
  in Danbury, Connecticut
 WFKL in Fairport, New York
  in Fredericksburg, Virginia
  in Tampa, Florida
 WFOC-LP in Florence, South Carolina
 WFYN-LP in Birmingham, Alabama
 WHJG-LP in Rockford, Illinois
  in La Crosse, Wisconsin
 WJBT in Callahan, Florida
 WJOB-FM in Susquehanna, Pennsylvania
 WKCJ in White Sulphur Springs, West Virginia
  in Midland, Michigan
 WKVW in Marmet, West Virginia
  in Paducah, Kentucky
  in Milwaukee, Wisconsin
 WLVC-LP in Birmingham, Alabama
 WMMR in Philadelphia, Pennsylvania
  in Youngstown, Ohio
  in Shalimar, Florida
  in Belmont, New Hampshire
 WNRB-LP in Wausau, Wisconsin
 WODC in Ashville, Ohio
  in Salisbury, North Carolina
 WOPW-LP in Mount Vernon, Kentucky
  in Peoria, Illinois
 WPJB-LP in Selma, Alabama
 WPLP-LP in Athens, Georgia
 WPLX-LP in Pelham, Alabama
  in Linton, Indiana
  in New Orleans, Louisiana
  in Meyersdale, Pennsylvania
 WRFR-LP in Rockland, Maine
 WSHD-LP in Eastport, Maine
  in Taunton, Massachusetts
  in Houston, Mississippi
 WTPP-LP in Gobles, Michigan
 WTPT in Forest City, North Carolina
  in Ramsey, Illinois
  in Manchester, Georgia
 WVFT in Gretna, Florida
 WWDH-LP in Fort Myers, Florida
  in New Market, Alabama
  in Jamestown, New York
 WWWZ in Summerville, South Carolina
 WXLN-LP in Shelbyville, Kentucky
 WYPM in Chambersburg, Pennsylvania
 WZAE in Wadley, Georgia
  in Ponce, Puerto Rico

References

Lists of radio stations by frequency